Marie Ndjeka Opombo is the Ambassador of the Democratic Republic of the Congo to the United Kingdom.  She is also a non-resident Ambassador to Norway.

When she was fifteen, she went to Belgium to study at the Higher Institute of Economic Science and the Institute of Higher Education in Social Communication, graduating with a teaching degree. She went on to earn a Business English degree from Manchester University.

References

Women ambassadors
Ambassadors of the Democratic Republic of the Congo to the United Kingdom
Ambassadors of the Democratic Republic of the Congo to Norway
Year of birth missing (living people)
Living people
21st-century Democratic Republic of the Congo people
Place of birth missing (living people)